Epaulette   (foaled 9 November 2009) is a multiple Group One winning thoroughbred racehorse and successful stallion.

Background

Epaulette was homebred by Darley Stud and is a three-quarter brother to Group One winning stallion, Helmet.

Racing career

Epaulette won the Black Opal Stakes as a two-year-old.

As a three-year-old he had success in the Caulfield Guineas Prelude and the Group 1 Golden Rose Stakes. He also ran second behind the unbeaten Black Caviar in her final ever start in the 2013 TJ Smith Stakes.

Epaulette won his second Group 1 when successful in the Doomben 10,000.   Epaulette only had one start as a four-year-old and was retired to stud.

Stud career

Between 2014 and 2020 Epaulette acted as a shuttle stallion for Darley between Europe and Australia.

In 2021 he was sold by Darley to the Turkish Jockey Club where he will continue stallion duties for the 2022 season.

Notable progeny

c = colt, f = filly, g = gelding

Pedigree

References 

Racehorses bred in Australia
Racehorses trained in Australia
2009 racehorse births
Thoroughbred family 7-f